Bad Segeberg (Low German: Sebarg) is a German town of 16,000 inhabitants, located in the state of Schleswig-Holstein, capital of the district (Kreis) Segeberg.

It is famous for its annual Karl May Festival, which takes place in the town's Kalkberg Stadium, a large amphitheater originally built by the Reich Labour Service into an exploited quarry at the Segeberger Kalkberg.

There is a large television tower in the middle of the town.

Geography
Bad Segeberg is not far from the eastern edge of the hills of Ostholstein. The western part of the town is bordered by the Trave, the northern part by the Ihlsee and forests, the northeast is bordered by the Großer Segeberger See, and the west is also bordered by forests. In the south, Bad Segeberg is bordered by the towns of Högersdorf and Klein Gladebrügge.

Geologically, the area around Bad Segeberg is unique because it is the only area with Karst topography in Schleswig-Holstein, which is indicated by the presence of sinkholes in the area. There were even sinkholes in the town itself, although these have all been filled in and are no longer visible. The only exception is the Kleiner Segeberger See, which is a sinkhole that is filled with water at the foot of the Segeberger Kalkberg.

Notable people
 Werner Wrangel (1922–1945), decorated Army officer
 Maria Jepsen (born 1945), Lutheran bishop
 Christian Habicht (1952–2010), actor
 Gero Storjohann (born 1958), politician, member of the CDU 
 Detlev Buck (born 1962), film director, actor, producer and screenwriter
 Frauke Kuhlmann (born 1966), women's international footballer 
 Alexander Holtmann (born 1978), cinema, television and theatre actor 
 Mona Barthel (born 1990), tennis player
 Rachel Rinast (born 1991), footballer  
 Janek Sternberg (born 1992), footballer
 Fiete Arp (born 2000), footballer

Twin towns – sister cities

Bad Segeberg is twinned with:
 Kiryat Motzkin, Israel
 Riihimäki, Finland
 Teterow, Germany 
 Võru, Estonia
 Złocieniec, Poland

References

Towns in Schleswig-Holstein
Spa towns in Germany
Segeberg